Dan Marohl (born March 30, 1978) is a former indoor lacrosse player for the Minnesota Swarm in the National Lacrosse League. Marohl attended the University of Maryland, Baltimore County, where he was teammates with former Philadelphia Wings teammate Jeff Ratcliffe.

In 1996, Marohl completed his senior year at St. Mary's High School in Annapolis, Maryland, where he led his team to a perfect 17–0 record in the ultra-competitive MIAA "A" Conference en route to the championship. Due to his excellence on the field, he was named the C. Markland Kelly Award winner - given annually to the most outstanding player in the MIAA. That year, The St. Mary's Saints finished the season ranked #1 in the national rankings by USLacrosse, making them the de facto High School National Champions.

Marohl has been named to Team USA in the 2007 World Indoor Lacrosse Championships.

On December 5, 2006, Marohl was selected by the Los Angeles Riptide in the 
Major League Lacrosse Supplemental Draft.

Dan Marhol is currently retired from Lacrosse and works for Veeam Software in Baltimore, Maryland.

NLL career 

Marohl began his career with the Ottawa Rebel, and was traded to the Philadelphia Wings during the 2003 season. He was a very accurate passer leading to many assists, while most of his goals come from outside shots.  Marohl was selected to the 2006 NLL East Division All-Star team.

Marohl was traded to the Minnesota Swarm in March, 2008.

Statistics

NLL

UMBC

References

1979 births
Living people
National Lacrosse League All-Stars
Minnesota Swarm players
Philadelphia Wings players
American lacrosse players
UMBC Retrievers men's lacrosse players